The Chelsea Collection is a priceless anthology of prints and pictures of old Chelsea. Begun in 1887, it contains works by artists as notable and diverse as Rossetti and Whistler. During his time at the Library, Armitage Denton built the Collection assiduously so that by the time of his death in July 1949, it numbered more than 1,000 items. At the end of the 20th century, the Collection totalled more than 5,000 works, and it continues to grow.

Culture in London
Libraries in the Royal Borough of Kensington and Chelsea
Chelsea, London
1887 works